Frederick Stanley 'Rick' Kemp (born 15 November 1941) is an English bass player, guitarist, songwriter, vocalist and record producer, best known for his work with the British folk rock band Steeleye Span.

Projects
In the 1960s, he shot to prominence through his work with singer-songwriter Michael Chapman, and had a reputation within the music industry as a rock and blues session bassist, before his transition into British folk rock. Kemp joined Steeleye Span in 1972, left in 1986, rejoined in 2000, and left again at the end of 2016.

In 1971 Kemp auditioned for King Crimson, and got the gig shortly before the band recorded their album Islands. However, he turned down the opportunity to join them permanently, and reportedly departed the band after just a week, with his role as bassist being filled by singer Boz Burrell.

Kemp has played bass on a number of Maddy Prior records, and was a member of the Maddy Prior Band in the 1980s. The 1990 album Happy Families was officially credited to "Maddy Prior and Rick Kemp".

He also played on solo albums by former Steeleye Span member Tim Hart in the 1970s and 1980s.
In the 1990s he joined Doug Morter (Albion Band) and Jerry Donahue (Fotheringay, Fairport Convention) in The Backroom Boys. In 2007 again with Morter and Donahue he formed The Gathering (later Gathering Britannia) alongside Kristina Donahue, Ray Jackson and Clive Bunker. They released one album The Bridge Between (2011)

In 1979 Kemp co-founded the record label Plant Life with Steeleye Span drummer Nigel Pegrum. The label was discontinued in 1984.

He has released five solo albums: Escape (1996), Spies (1998), Codes (2004), Fanfare (2009) and Perfect Blue (2018). The line-up for his first two solo albums consisted primarily of a traditional Blues three-piece, with Kemp working alongside Spud Sinclair on guitar and Charlie Carruthers on drums. His more recent albums have seen Kemp himself playing most of the instruments, with various guest musicians.

From 1997 to around 2009, Kemp was the producer for the ceilidh dance band, Whapweasel. He also occasionally played guitar (as opposed to bass) with them.

Personal life
Kemp was born Little Hanford, Dorset, UK. He lives in Carlisle, Cumbria and was a Music Tutor at Cumbria College of Art and Design in Carlisle in 1996.

He was the husband of Steeleye Span lead vocalist Maddy Prior, but they have since divorced. He is also the father of the musician Rose Kemp and hip-hop artist 'Kemp' whose first name is Alex.

References

1941 births
Living people
English male singers
English songwriters
English bass guitarists
English male guitarists
Male bass guitarists
English folk musicians
English record producers
Musicians from Dorset
Steeleye Span members
King Crimson members
British folk rock musicians
English modern pagans
Performers of modern pagan music